Lady L. is a 1958 novel by the French writer Romain Gary. Gary wrote the book in English and translated it to French himself in 1963. Peter Ustinov directed a 1965 film with the same title, based on the novel. The film ends with the revelation that, with her husband's consent, Armand has been living with Lady L—and fathering her children—while posing as her now-elderly chauffeur. In the book, Armand does father her son, thereby founding a dynasty of illustrious grandchildren. However, when they rendezvous in the summerhouse, she realizes that the anarchist cause is Armand's true love. He will always use her; he will never be hers. She persuades him to hide from the approaching authorities in the Madras strongbox. Sixty years later, she unlocks the box before the horrified Poet Laureate, revealing Armand's skeleton.

See also
 1958 in literature
 20th-century French literature

References

1958 French novels
Novels by Romain Gary
English-language novels
French novels adapted into films
Michael Joseph books